HD 35759 is a high proper motion star located in the circumpolar constellation Camelopardalis. With an apparent magnitude of 7.74, it's impossible to see with the unaided eye, but can be seen with binoculars.

Properties 
This is a G-type star with 15% more mass than the Sun, but has 1.76 times the radius. It radiates at about 3 solar luminosities, and has an effective temperature of 5,927 K, which gives it a yellow hue. HD 35759 is slightly enriched in metals, with having 9.6% more iron abundance than the Sun. Like many G-type stars, HD 35759 rotates rather slowly, with a projected rotational velocity of 3 km/s.

Planetary System 
In 2016, a gas giant was discovered orbiting the star on an eccentric orbit. Since the planet was discovered using doppler spectroscopy, its radius and true mass is unknown.

References 

35759
G-type main-sequence stars
025883
Camelopardalis (constellation)
Planetary systems with one confirmed planet